Searingtown is a hamlet and census-designated place (CDP) in the Town of North Hempstead in Nassau County, on Long Island, in New York, United States. It is considered part of the Greater Roslyn area, which is anchored by the Village of Roslyn. The population was 4,915 at the 2010 census.

Searingtown has two zip codes, corresponding to both Roslyn and Albertson, NY respectively.

History 
One of the earliest settlers in the area was named John Searing. The name of the hamlet became Searingtown in the mid-18th Century; the Searing family was the area's principal owner of land at the time. The Searingtown Methodist Church first opened on I.U. Willets Road in 1788. Parts of the original structure are still part of the church. The building still stands in the same place but it is technically now in Albertson.

Geography 

Demographics

As of the census of 2000, there were 5,034 people, 1,582 households, and 1,430 families residing in the CDP. The population density was 5,473.4 per square mile (2,112.7/km2). There were 1,606 housing units at an average density of 1,746.2/sq mi (674.0/km2). The racial makeup of the CDP was 69.77% White, 0.99% African American, 0.10% Native American, 25.86% Asian, 0.70% from other races, and 2.58% from two or more races. Hispanic or Latino of any race were 2.86% of the population.

There were 1,582 households, out of which 41.9% had children under the age of 18 living with them, 83.1% were married couples living together, 5.3% had a female householder with no husband present, and 9.6% were non-families. 8.7% of all households were made up of individuals, and 6.0% had someone living alone who was 65 years of age or older. The average household size was 3.18 and the average family size was 3.37.

In the CDP, the population was spread out, with 26.8% under the age of 18, 6.2% from 18 to 24, 21.8% from 25 to 44, 29.0% from 45 to 64, and 16.2% who were 65 years of age or older. The median age was 42 years. For every 100 females, there were 94.6 males. For every 100 females age 18 and over, there were 90.2 males.

The median income for a household in the CDP was $120,546, and the median income for a family was $126,182. Males had a median income of $92,834 versus $51,995 for females. The per capita income for the CDP was $49,113. About 1.1% of families and 1.1% of the population were below the poverty line, including 1.0% of those under age 18 and 2.1% of those age 65 or over.

Government

Town representation 
As Searingtown is an unincorporated part of the Town of North Hempstead, it is directly governed by the town's government in Manhasset.

As of September 2021, Searingtown is represented on the Town Board by Peter J. Zuckerman, and is located in its 2nd Council District.

Representation in higher government

Nassau County representation 
Searingtown is primarily located in Nassau County's 10th Legislative district, which as of January 2023 is represented in the Nassau County Legislature by Mazi Melesa Pilip (R–Great Neck). However a small portion of the hamlet is within Nassau County's 9th Legislative District, which as of September 2021 was represented in the Nassau County Legislature by Richard Nicoello (R–New Hyde Park).

New York State representation

New York State Assembly 
Searingtown is located in the New York State Assembly's 16th Assembly district, which as of September 2021 is represented by Gina Sillitti (D–Manorhaven).

New York State Senate 
Searingtown is located in the New York State Senate's 7th State Senate district, which as of September 2021 is represented in the New York State Senate by Anna Kaplan (D–North Hills).

Federal representation

United States Congress 
Searingtown is located in New York's 3rd congressional district, which as of September 2021 is represented in the United States Congress by Tom Suozzi (D–Glen Cove).

United States Senate 
Like the rest of New York, Searingtown is represented in the United States Senate by Charles Schumer (D) and Kirsten Gillibrand (D).

Politics 
In the 2016 U.S. presidential election, the majority of Searingtown voters voted for Hillary Clinton (D).

Education
Searingtown is served by the Herricks Union Free School District. As such, all children who reside within the hamlet and attend public schools go to that district's schools.

Furthermore, the following schools, which are operated by the aforementioned district, are located within the hamlet:
 Searingtown Elementary School
 Herricks Middle School
 Herricks High School

Infrastructure

Transportation

Road 
A small portion of the Northern State Parkway forms much of the northern border of Searingtown; the historic Long Island Motor Parkway used to pass through the hamlet, as well.

Other major roads which travel through Searingtown include I.U. Willets Road, Searingtown Road, Shelter Rock Road, and Willis Avenue.

Rail 
No rail lines pass through Searingtown. The nearest Long Island Rail Road stations to the hamlet are Manhasset on the Port Washington Branch, New Hyde Park on the Main Line and Albertson on the Oyster Bay Branch.

Bus 
The n23 bus route runs along Willis Avenue at the eastern edge of Searingtown. This bus line is operated by Nassau Inter-County Express (NICE).

Utilities

Natural gas 
National Grid USA provides natural gas to homes and businesses that are hooked up to natural gas lines in Searingtown.

Power 
PSEG Long Island provides power to all homes and businesses within Searingtown.

The former Motor Parkway's right-of-way now serves as the route of a power line through the area.

Sewage 
All of Searingtown is connected to sanitary sewers, which are part of the Nassau County Sewage District, which handles and treats the hamlet's sanitary waste.

Water 
Searingtown is primarily located within the boundaries of (and is thus served by) the Albertson Water District. However, much of the southern part of the hamlet is located within the boundaries of (and is thus served by) the Garden City Park Water District.

References

External links

 Albertson Fire Company

Town of North Hempstead, New York
Census-designated places in New York (state)
Census-designated places in Nassau County, New York